William Fairall (c. 1724 – 26 April 1749) was an English outlaw, highwayman, smuggler and senior member of the Hawkhurst Gang. In 1749, he was hanged at Tyburn, alongside Thomas Kingsmill and Richard Perin.

Origins 
Fairall was a native of Goudhurst, Kent and baptised there in 1724, the son of Roger Fairall and Mary née Nugent. He and his younger brother John were orphaned at a young age and as a result, sent to work on a sheep farm near Cranbrook. It is thought that he acquired the alias 'Shepherd' during this time. 

On 11 January 1743, he married Mary Smith, daughter of the Horsmonden innkeeper, with whom he had two children, John (born 1744) and Frances (born 1747).

Hawkhurst Gang 
Around 1745, Fairall became a fully-active member of the Hawkhurst Gang, a notorious smuggling syndicate, with operations from Kent to Dorset. He had been involved with the gang since boyhood, however, often tending to their horses. Fairall was notorious for his brutal courage and it was "not considered safe to offend him". The Hawkhurst Gang were highly wanted during this period and the Duke of Richmond pursued the gang with a vengeance. Richmond would go on to place an arrest warrant and bounty on Fairall's head.

In 1747 he was first apprehended for smuggling in Sussex and sent for trial in London by James Butler. However, while on route, Fairall managed to escape and evade the authorities. Kingsmill later plotted to kill Butler in revenge. In April 1747 the gang fought against local militia at the Battle of Goudhurst. In September 1747, the gang's smuggling cutter Three Brothers was intercepted by the authorities and its contents confiscated at Poole Customs House. In October, the gang famously raided the customs house to retrieve their illicit, lucrative goods. The incident at the Customs House made the gang notorious across Britain due to the audacity of the act. King George II gave orders for issuing a proclamation, with a reward for the apprehension of the offenders.

Capture and execution 
Between 1748 and 1749, several leading members of the gang were tried, convicted and executed for the murders of William Galley, a customs official, and Daniel Chater a shoemaker. Fairall was captured and imprisoned at Newgate prison alongside fellow gang members Thomas Kingsmill, the leader, and Richard Perin, a French smuggler from Paris. 

On 26 April 1749, Fairall, Kingsmill and Perrin were convicted and sentenced to death. Fairall and Kingsmill were drawn in a cart with an escort of Horse and Foot guards behind. The pair were said to have been "remarkably undaunted; but all of them joined in devotion with the ordinary of Newgate when they came to the fatal tree". Fairall was hung at Tyburn Gallows and his body sent to the High Sheriff of Kent to be gibbeted.

Commemoration 
There is a memorial to William Fairall in Horsmonden, Kent, close to the village green where he had hung in the gibbet following his execution. The Highwayman Pub in Horsmonden is named for Fairall.

References 

1724 births
1749 deaths
English criminals
English smugglers
English highwaymen
People from Kent (before 1889)
People executed at Tyburn
People executed by the United Kingdom by hanging
History of Kent